Daniela del Carmen Morales Verde, is a model and a pageant titleholder (born May 11, 1988, in Cumaná, Venezuela) who was represented Sucre state in the Miss Venezuela 2009 pageant on September 24, 2009. She is a Telecommunications engineer.

She entered in Teen Model Venezuela 2004, and placed 6th.

References

External links
Miss Venezuela Official Website
Miss Venezuela La Nueva Era MB

1988 births
Living people
People from Cumaná
Venezuelan female models